Jimmie Lee Hoagland (born January 22, 1940) is a Pulitzer prize-winning American journalist. He is a contributing editor to The Washington Post, since 2010, previously serving as an associate editor, senior foreign correspondent, and columnist.

Hoagland is a graduate of the University of South Carolina and attended graduate school at Aix-Marseille University and Columbia University.

He has worked in journalism for over six-decades, beginning as a part-time reporter while a student. Hoagland has served as a foreign correspondent from Africa, France and Lebanon with the Post, and has been awarded two Pulitzer prizes, in 1971 and 1991. He authored one book, based on his coverage in South Africa.

Hoagland is married to novelist, Jane Stanton Hitchcock, and has two children.

Background and education 
Jimmie Lee Hoagland, was born in Rock Hill, South Carolina, to parents Lee Roy Hoagland Jr., and Edith Irene Sullivan.

He graduated from the University of South Carolina, in 1961, with his bachelor's in journalism. He attended post graduate programs at both the University of Aix-en-Provence (1961–62) in France and as a Ford Foundation fellow (1968–69) at Columbia University in New York.

He was an Annenberg Distinguished Visiting Fellow at Stanford University's Hoover Institution, (2010–13).

Hoagland served in the U.S. Air Force, stationed in Germany, from 1962 to 1964.

Career 
Hoagland began working in journalism in 1958, as a part-time reporter for the Rock Hill Evening News while a student.

He worked as a copy editor for The New York Times, from 1964 to 1966, before joining the Washington Post. At the Post, he served as a foreign correspondent, first in Nairobi as a correspondent in Africa, (1969–72) and later in Beirut (1972–75).

In 1976, Hoagland moved to Paris, France where he covered France, Italy and Spain, in his internationally syndicated column, until returning to the United States in 1978.

He is currently (2020) a contributing editor to The Washington Post, since 2010, previously serving as an associate editor, senior foreign correspondent, and columnist for twenty years.

1971 Pulitzer prize 
Writing for The Washington Post, Hoagland won the Pulitzer Prize for International Reporting in 1971 "for his coverage of the struggle against apartheid in the Republic of South Africa." Hoagland was banned from Africa  for five years for his reporting on South Africa and apartheid. He wrote a book, South Africa: Civilizations in Conflict, published in 1972.

1991 Pulitzer  prize 

Hoagland continued writing for The Washington Post, in Washington D.C., as a foreign editor and assistant managing editor for foreign news. In 1991 he won the Pulitzer Prize for Commentary "for searching and prescient columns on events leading up to the Gulf War and on the political problems of Mikhail Gorbachev."

Hoagland wrote the series of columns during the breakup of the Soviet Union; the winning series of stories are listed below.

 Gorbachev Feels The Heat, January 16, 1990
 Iraq: Outlaw State, March 29, 1990
 Soft on Saddam, April 10, 1990
 Gorbachev's Choices...And a Soviet Food Crisis, April 23, 1990
 Turning a Blind Eye to Baghdad, July 5, 1990
 A Real Arab Awakening, August 16, 1990
 ...And the Tale of a Transcript, September 17, 1990
 A Quick Rewrite of History, October 7, 1990
 Gorbachev's Nobel Lifeline, October 16, 1990
 As Good a Snake-Oil Merchant as There Is, November 13, 1990

Awards 

 1971 Pulitzer Prize for International Reporting, "for his coverage of the struggle against apartheid in the Republic of South Africa." 
 1977 Overseas Press Club Award for Best Interpretation of Foreign Affairs, Daily Newspaper or Wire Service
 1991  Pulitzer Prize for Commentary, "for searching and prescient columns on events leading up to the Gulf War and on the political problems of Mikhail Gorbachev."
 1994 Eugene Meyer Career Achievement Award
 2002 Cernobbio-Europa Prize by the editors of seven European newspapers for his international reporting
 2017 South Carolina Hall of Fame, in recognition as a distinguished writer, by the University of South Carolina

Quotes
Regarding the War on Terror:
 "The United States is engaged in a shadow war that must now be the central priority for this president and his administration for every day of his term." -- The Washington Post, 2001

References

External links

1940 births
Living people
People from Rock Hill, South Carolina
Pulitzer Prize for Commentary winners
Pulitzer Prize for International Reporting winners
The Washington Post people
Columbia University Graduate School of Journalism alumni
University of South Carolina alumni
20th-century American journalists
American male journalists